Bandy is an unincorporated community in Tazewell County, Virginia, United States. Bandy has a post office with ZIP code 24602.

The community was named for early settler William W. "Billy" Bandy.

References

Unincorporated communities in Tazewell County, Virginia
Unincorporated communities in Virginia